Frederick Charles Ferguson (January 18, 1884 – December 22, 1954) was a Canadian wrestler. He competed in the men's freestyle bantamweight at the 1904 Summer Olympics.

References

External links
 

1884 births
1954 deaths
Canadian male sport wrestlers
Olympic wrestlers of Canada
Wrestlers at the 1904 Summer Olympics
Sportspeople from Toronto